Ospriocerus is a genus of robber flies (insects in the family Asilidae). There are about 17 described species in Ospriocerus.

Species
 Ospriocerus aeacidinus (Williston, 1886)
 Ospriocerus aeacus (Wiedemann, 1828)
 Ospriocerus arizonensis (Bromley, 193k7)
 Ospriocerus brevis Martin, 1968
 Ospriocerus ebyi (Bromley, 1937)
 Ospriocerus galadae Martin, 1968
 Ospriocerus latipennis (Loew, 1866)
 Ospriocerus longulus (Loew, 1866)
 Ospriocerus minos Osten Sacken, 1877
 Ospriocerus nitens (Coquillett, 1904)
 Ospriocerus parksi Bromley, 1934
 Ospriocerus pumilus Coquillett
 Ospriocerus rhadamanthus Loew, 1866
 Ospriocerus tenebrosus (Coquillett, 1904)
 Ospriocerus tequilae Martin, 1968
 Ospriocerus vallensis Martin, 1968
 Ospriocerus villus Martin, 1968

References

Further reading

External links

 

Asilidae genera